"Odds and Ends" is a 1969 song by Dionne Warwick, written by Burt Bacharach and Hal David. It was released as a non-album single. Narrowly missing the U.S. Billboard Top 40, it reached the Top 20 on the Adult Contemporary charts of Canada and the U.S., where it peaked at number seven.

This song features a Whistler, heard in the intro, instrumental section, and the outro, before the song's fade, sections of the song.

In the song, the narrator wakes up, finding the bed empty and the closet bare, only to find an empty tube of toothpaste, as well as a half filled cup of coffee. the narrator misses the lover's presence, surrounded by the "odds and ends of a beautiful love affair."

Chart history

Cover versions
The song was covered by Johnny Mathis on his 1970 LP, Raindrops Keep Fallin' on My Head.  His version reached #30 on the U.S. Easy Listening chart.

References

External links
 
 

1969 songs
1969 singles
1970 singles
Dionne Warwick songs
Johnny Mathis songs
Songs with lyrics by Hal David
Songs with music by Burt Bacharach
Scepter Records singles
Columbia Records singles